The 1984 Winfield Australian Masters was a professional non-ranking snooker tournament took place between 25 June and 8 July 1984 at the Parmatta Club in Sydney, Australia.

Tony Knowles won the tournament by defeating John Virgo 7–3 in the final.

Main draw

Notes

References

Australian Goldfields Open
1984 in Australian sport
1984 in snooker